Ilyophis arx is an eel in the family Synaphobranchidae (cutthroat eels). It was described by Catherine H. Robins in 1976. It is a marine, deep water-dwelling eel which is known from the eastern Pacific and northeastern Atlantic Ocean.

References

Synaphobranchidae
Fish described in 1976